David Caiado Dias (born 2 May 1987), known as Caiado, is a Portuguese professional footballer who plays for Académica de Coimbra as a winger.

After starting out at Sporting CP, he went to compete professionally – his own notwithstanding – in six countries.

Club career
Born in Luxembourg City, Luxembourg, Caiado joined Sporting CP's youth system at the age of 13, but made only one appearance for the first team as a senior, coming on as a late substitute for Rodrigo Tello in a 3–2 away loss against S.C. Braga on 7 January 2006. He subsequently spent two seasons on loan to G.D. Estoril Praia in the second division, being scarcely played during his stint mainly due to a serious injury.

In June 2008, Caiado joined C.D. Trofense which had just been promoted to the Primeira Liga. He played in slightly half of the league games in his first year, but the club was immediately relegated.

Caiado was loaned to Ekstraklasa side Zagłębie Lubin on 29 June 2009. He returned to Trofa in the following transfer window, however, going on to total 17 matches.

In the summer of 2010, Caiado joined Olympiakos Nicosia in the Cypriot First Division. He moved clubs and countries again on 29 December 2011, signing a two-and-a-half-year contract with PFC Beroe Stara Zagora in Bulgaria. He made his First Professional Football League debut in a 3–0 defeat at PFC Ludogorets Razgrad on 3 March 2012. He scored his first competitive goal for his new team two weeks later, against PSFC Chernomorets Burgas, ending his first season with 13 games and six goals.

On 23 January 2014, moved to SC Tavriya Simferopol which at the time ranked second-last in the Ukrainian Premier League. After the Crimean club was disbanded following the peninsula's annexation by Russia, he returned to Portugal's top flight and became Vitória SC's first signing of the summer. The following 28 February, he returned to Ukraine by joining FC Metalist Kharkiv, whom he helped to sixth place during his brief stint.

Caiado moved to the fifth foreign country of his career on 3 September 2015, joining SD Ponferradina of Spain's Segunda División. He scored four goals in his first season, which ended in relegation.

In January 2018, Caiado joined several compatriots at Romanian club CS Gaz Metan Mediaș. On 11 June 2019, he agreed to a deal at fellow Liga I team FC Hermannstadt. In September 2020, both he and teammate Goran Karanović were loaned to FCSB for a single match (against FC Slovan Liberec in the third qualifying round of the UEFA Europa League) as the squad was severely undermanned due to the COVID-19 pandemic.

Caiado returned to Portugal and its second tier on 20 January 2021, agreeing to a one-and-a-half-year deal at F.C. Penafiel.

Club statistics

Honours
Beroe
Bulgarian Cup: 2012–13
Bulgarian Supercup: 2013

References

External links

1987 births
Living people
Luxembourgian people of Portuguese descent
Portuguese footballers
Association football wingers
Primeira Liga players
Liga Portugal 2 players
Campeonato de Portugal (league) players
Sporting CP footballers
G.D. Estoril Praia players
C.D. Trofense players
Vitória S.C. players
Vitória S.C. B players
F.C. Penafiel players
Associação Académica de Coimbra – O.A.F. players
Ekstraklasa players
Zagłębie Lubin players
Cypriot First Division players
Olympiakos Nicosia players
First Professional Football League (Bulgaria) players
PFC Beroe Stara Zagora players
Ukrainian Premier League players
SC Tavriya Simferopol players
FC Metalist Kharkiv players
Segunda División players
Segunda División B players
SD Ponferradina players
Liga I players
CS Gaz Metan Mediaș players
FC Hermannstadt players
FC Steaua București players
Portugal youth international footballers
Portuguese expatriate footballers
Expatriate footballers in Poland
Expatriate footballers in Cyprus
Expatriate footballers in Bulgaria
Expatriate footballers in Ukraine
Expatriate footballers in Spain
Expatriate footballers in Romania
Portuguese expatriate sportspeople in Poland
Portuguese expatriate sportspeople in Cyprus
Portuguese expatriate sportspeople in Bulgaria
Portuguese expatriate sportspeople in Ukraine
Portuguese expatriate sportspeople in Spain
Portuguese expatriate sportspeople in Romania